The Jack Pesch Bridge is a bridge for pedestrians and cyclists which crosses the Brisbane River. The bridge is named in honour of Jack Pesch ( 1917 – 2002), a cycling champion during the 1930s. He subsequently ran a bicycle shop in Petrie Terrace, Brisbane, until the mid-1990s, selling and servicing his own 'Rocket' cycles and cycle parts.

The bridge crosses the Indooroopilly Reach of the River, linking Chelmer and Indooroopilly. It is immediately adjacent to the Albert and Walter Taylor Bridges.
It was opened on 2 October 1998 by the Queensland Minister for Transport, Steve Bredhauer, and the Lord Mayor of Brisbane, Jim Soorley.

The bridge is for the exclusive use of pedestrians and cyclists.

External links

References

Bridges in Brisbane
Bridges completed in 1998
Cable-stayed bridges in Australia
Bridges over the Brisbane River
Pedestrian bridges in Australia
Steel bridges in Australia
History of Brisbane
Indooroopilly, Queensland
Chelmer, Queensland